The Sarasin family (Thai: สารสิน) refers to a wealthy assimilated Thai Chinese business clan that rose to prominence during the 19th century. The family monopolised a number of bureaucratic offices and established a number of key businesses, one of which – the Thai Pure Drinks Co. Ltd – remains to this day and is co-owned by the family. The entrenched status of the Sarasin clan has been noted by many Thai historians and sociologists as exemplifying the successful integration of Chinese immigrants in Thailand throughout the 19th and 20th centuries, and their descendants' subsequent influence on Thailand's economy and politics.

Key family members 
Members of the Sarasin family include former Thai prime minister and SEATO secretary-general Pote Sarasin; Thian Hee (aristocratic title: Phraya Sarasinswamiphakdi); former deputy prime minister and influential businessman Pong Sarasin; former police chief general and interior minister Pao Sarasin; former foreign minister and royal secretary Arsa Sarasin. Patee Sarasin, a son of Arsa Sarasin, was the longtime CEO of Nok Air. The Sarasin family, along with the Lamsam and the Wanglee families, have been included in a number of academic studies about elite Thai-Chinese control of business corporations and the consolidation of control through political means. The family's political legacy has often resulted in its comparison to the Kennedy family in the United States.

Family history 
The Sarasin family's passage into the political and economic arena was largely due to the pioneering entrepreneurialism of Thian Hee – the first member of the family to be elevated to noble status and to be bestowed with a Thai surname. Thian Hee, although already a wealthy rice trader, contributed to the family's economic status by investing in a number of industries, establishing the family's reputation in Bangkok. Thien Hee was the first Thai doctor to graduate from Columbia University in New York city and was the first medical doctor in the Royal Thai Army He participated in various campaigns during the Thai-Laotian wars of 1865–1890. Thien Hee was awarded for his medical expertise as well as his loyalty, and was thus elevated to noble rank. Having retired from the army he pursued his business interests, amassing a considerable wealth and establishing many major Thai corporations – such as Siam Cement Public Co. Ltd – of which his grandchildren and great-grandchildren sit on the board. His son, Pote, continued and strengthened the family's political and business legacy by cultivating ties with the royal family and other bureaucratic elites. Pote became an influential statesman, serving as Prime Minister in 1957 under the coup-installed government when Field Marshal Sarit Thanarat seized power. Pote became instrumental in maintaining diplomatic relations between the Thai military government and the United States during the 1950s.

Legacy 
Pote became the family patriarch and expanded his family's business holdings during Thailand's dramatic economic development, which coincided with the rise of the "Tiger Economies" of South-east Asia. The family currently controls, through its possession of shares, a number of large corporations in Thailand, notably Thai Pure Drinks Co. Ltd, the sole bottler for Coca-Cola in Thailand. Other corporations include the Home Product Centre Public Co. Ltd, Honda Automobile (Thailand) Co. Ltd and the Sarasin Co. Ltd. Due to the family's penetration into the upper echelons of society, "Sarasin" became synonymous with wealth and respectability during the 19th century. A number of national landmarks continue to represent the family's heritage, such as the Sarasin Road and the Sarasin Building in Bangkok, or Sarasin Bridge, connecting Phuket to mainland Thailand.

References

External links 
 
 http://www.cambridge.org/aus/catalogue/catalogue.asp?isbn=9780521759151&ss=ind
 http://www.thaibma.or.th/bond_info/issuer_details.aspx?id=22706
 http://www.bangkokpost.com/business/company-in-thailand/listing/home-product-center-pcl/822/

Thai families
Thai Chinese families